The 1991 South Australian National Football League (SANFL) Grand Final saw the North Adelaide defeat the West Adelaide by 75 points. The match was played on Saturday 5 October 1991 at Football Park in front of a crowd of 39,276.

Teams

References 

SANFL Grand Finals
Sanfl Grand Final, 1991